Strumigenys nanzanensis is a species of yellow ant endemic to Taiwan.

This ant is similar to Strumigenys minutula but is larger (workers up to 3.2 mm in length), hairier and with straighter mandibular shafts.

References

Myrmicinae
Insects described in 1996
Endemic fauna of Taiwan
Hymenoptera of Asia
Insects of Taiwan